Alessandro Taverna (born 1983 in Portogruaro, Venice) is an Italian pianist. He trained at the Accademia Pianistica "Incontri col Maestro" in Imola with Franco Scala, Leonid Margarius and Boris Petrushansky; he later specialized with Arie Vardi at the Hochschule für Musik, Theater und Medien Hannover and at the International Piano Academy Lake Como working with Dmitri Bashkirov, Malcolm Bilson, Fou Ts'ong, and Stanislav Ioudenitch. He has been a "Lieven Scholar" at the Conservatorio della Svizzera Italiana (Lugano) pursuing his master's degree in Advanced Performance Studies with William Grant Naboré.

Competition record
 2003 – A. Scriabin, Grosseto: 1st prize
 2009 – London International Piano Competition, London: 2nd prize
 2009 – Minnesota International Piano-e-Competition, Minneapolis-Saint Paul: 1st prize
 2009 – Leeds International Pianoforte Competition, Leeds: 3rd prize
 2010 – A. Benedetti Michelangeli Prize, Eppan
 2011 – Busoni International Piano Competition, Bolzano]: 5th prize

References

External links

Italian classical pianists
Male classical pianists
Italian male pianists
1983 births
Living people
21st-century classical pianists
21st-century Italian male musicians